Mark Radford (born 20 December 1968) is an English former footballer who played in the Football League as a midfielder for Colchester United. He has two daughters, Alice and Georgie Radford.

Career

Born in Leicester, Radford was a product of Colchester United's youth policy who went on to make his first-team debut in the Associate Members Cup during the 1986–87 season, coming on as a substitute for Keith Day in a 2–0 defeat to Gillingham on 26 January 1987. He made no further appearances during the season, but made 15 appearances in all competitions during the 1987–88 season, and scored his first goal the following season in a 2–1 defeat to Darlington at Layer Road which put Colchester bottom of the Football League on 25 November 1988.

On a personal level, Radford had a more successful 1989–90 season, scoring four goals in 19 league starts, but Colchester ended the season relegated to the Football Conference and outside of the Football League for the first time in 40 years. He had made 64 Football League appearances and scored five times for the club prior to their relegation. He played very few games in the Conference under manager Ian Atkins, amassing just one start and three substitute appearances before being released on the final day of the transfer window in early 1991. He went on to play for Wivenhoe Town and Bury Town.

References

1968 births
Living people
Footballers from Leicester
English footballers
Association football midfielders
Colchester United F.C. players
Wivenhoe Town F.C. players
Bury Town F.C. players
English Football League players
National League (English football) players